Colin Fleming and Ken Skupski were the defenders of title; however, they chose to compete in Nice instead.
Alexander Peya and Martin Slanar won in the final 7–5, 7–5 against Rik de Voest and Izak van der Merwe.

Seeds

Draw

Draw

References
 Main Draw

Trofeo Paolo Corazzi - Doubles
Trofeo Paolo Corazzi